Ward 1 is a ward of Giá Rai town in Bạc Liêu Province, Vietnam.

The ward is formerly Giá Rai township, the capital of former Giá Rai District.

References 

Communes of Bạc Liêu province
Populated places in Bạc Liêu province